The Royal Treatment is the sixth studio album by American country pop artist Billy Joe Royal, which was released in 1987.

Three singles from this album charted on the Country Singles chart.  The first was "I'll Pin a Note on Your Pillow", which peaked at #5 in 1987.  This was followed by "It Keeps Right On a-Hurtin'" (#17) and "Out of Sight and on My Mind" (#10), both that charted in 1988.

The album also landed on the Country Albums chart, reaching #5 in 1987.

Track listing

Personnel
Acoustic Guitar: Kenny Bell, Brent Rowan, Billy Sanford
Bass guitar: Gary Lunn, Bob Wray
Drums: Jerry Kroon
Electric Guitar: Kenny Mims, Brent Rowan
Horns: Jim Horn, Wayne Jackson, Charles Rose, Harvey Thompson
Piano: Ron Oates
Percussion: Jerry Kroon, Ron "Snake" Reynolds
Steel Guitar: Sonny Garrish
Synthesizer: David Huntsinger, Ron Oates
Background Vocals: Michael Mishaw

Charts

Weekly charts

Year-end charts

References

1987 albums
Billy Joe Royal albums
Atlantic Records albums